Robert Norman Davis  (born 14 March 1945), best known by his stage name, Jasper Carrott, is an English comedian, actor, and television presenter.

Early life
Born in Shaftmoor Lane, Acocks Green, in Birmingham, Carrott was educated at Acocks Green Primary School and Moseley Grammar School. He worked as a trainee buyer at a city centre department store, the Beehive, with schoolmate Bev Bevan.

He acquired the nickname Jasper aged nine, and added the surname Carrott when he was 17.

Career

In February 1969, he started his own folk club, "The Boggery", in nearby Solihull with his friend Les Ward. Carrott performed folk songs and as an MC. His banter overtook the songs and he became more a comedian than a singer. He also worked as a musical agent (with John Starkey, who was his manager from 1974 to 1992), as Fingimigig, managing among others Harvey Andrews. He toured UK rugby clubs. He recorded an album in 1973 called Jasper Carrot – In the Club, which he sold from his van. The album contained the original "Magic Roundabout", although mainly material used in his next three LPs (such as "Hare Krishna", "Car Insurance", "Bastity Chelt", and "Hava Nagila") plus the Fred Wedlock song "The Folker".

He had a UK Top 5 chart hit in August 1975 with the novelty double A-side record, "Funky Moped" / "Magic Roundabout", written by Chris Rohmann and produced by Jeff Lynne, with Bev Bevan on drums and backing vocals on the former track, recorded at Grosvenor Road Studios for DJM Records.

By the late 1970s, Carrott had developed anecdotal sketches which he still performs. Often they purport to be autobiographical; many celebrate the Birmingham accent and culture, including his support of Birmingham City.

His live performances were recorded as Jasper Carrott Rabbitts on and on and on... and Carrott in Notts. Notable tracks were "Bastity Chelt", a song in Spoonerism, "The Football Match" describing a visit to Old Trafford, "The Nutter on the Bus" (including the cry "Has anybody seen my camel?"), "The Mole" ("There's only one way to get rid of a mole – blow its bloody head off!") and "Zits" – an explanation of American slang for spots that brought the word into use in Britain.

In 1979, he published A Little Zit on the Side, a humorous autobiography. The follow-up, Sweet and Sour Labrador, mixed sections of stand-up routines with similar autobiographical material, much of it related to his world travels. Carrott was once a compère for the Birmingham Heart Beat Charity Concert 1986, which featured local bands such as Electric Light Orchestra and the Moody Blues, with a finale that included George Harrison from the Beatles. On 15 September 2007, he was inducted into the Birmingham Walk of Stars at the Arts Fest 2007 celebrations. The award was presented by the Lord Mayor of Birmingham. Carrott is the second inductee, following Ozzy Osbourne. Carrott was awarded the Lifetime Achievement Award by the British Comedy Awards on 6 December 2008.

His first appearance on television was a half-hour show for BBC Midlands on 11 August 1975, in a programme about local football called "The Golden Game". In 1976, he appeared in A Half Hour Mislaid with Jasper Carrott, recorded at Pebble Mill. His big break came two years later, when Michael Grade asked for a pilot programme for LWT. Grade liked it, and five further shows were recorded, which became his first TV series, An Audience with Jasper Carrott, in 1978. This partnership with LWT lasted until 1981; The Unrecorded Jasper Carrott (1979) and Beat the Carrott (1981) are the best-known live stand-up performances from his time with LWT.

Carrott moved to the BBC for Carrott's Lib, a Saturday night comedy broadcast live, and then a string of BBC shows. These included Carrott's Commercial Breakdown, which broadcast weird adverts from around the world, and the sketch and stand-up shows Carrott Confidential, 24 Carrott Gold, The Trial of Jasper Carrott, and Canned Carrott, some of which also featured Steve Punt and Hugh Dennis. One popular sketch involved Carrott reading out genuine, but bizarre motor insurance claim statements, such as "I drove out of my drive at 7am and drove straight into a bus. The bus was ten minutes early."

Carrott played Heinrich in the 1987 British comedy film Jane and the Lost City.

Canned Carrott also featured a spoof police drama called The Detectives, co-starring Robert Powell, which later was made into a series. From 2002 to 2004, he starred in the sitcom All About Me. In a twelve-week run in the summer of 2002 he played the part of Ko-Ko in comic opera The Mikado, written by Gilbert and Sullivan at the Savoy Theatre in London.

He performed in several of the Secret Policeman's Ball charity concerts for Amnesty International, and returned to the stage in 2004 at the National Indoor Arena in Birmingham featuring classic routines from his career. He returned to singing for the musical Go Play Up Your Own End (written by Malcolm Stent, songs by Harvey Andrews) in 2005.

In 2005, he staged and appeared in the first Jasper Carrott's Rock With Laughter concert. This became a regular at the NEC in Birmingham, usually in December and sometimes alternating with his "Jasper Carrott's Christmas Crackers" events.

In summer 2007, Carrott hosted the Endemol-produced game show Golden Balls for ITV1.

He hosted the Sunday night national pub quiz, Cash Inn. He was 20th in Channel 4's 100 Greatest Stand-Up Comedians show.

In August 2017, Carrott underwent an operation to clear a blocked artery, followed by a quadruple heart bypass. A 30-date tour was cancelled. He has since said the surgery gave him a new lease of life and he has no plans to retire, citing Ken Dodd's longevity as an example.

Literary work
Carrott has written the humorous paperbacks A Little Zit on the Side (1979), and Sweet and Sour Labrador (1982). He also wrote a novel called Shop! or a Store is Born.

Carrott's former manager, John Starkey, has written a book entitled Jasper and Me (1993; Etsiketsi Books), which included the line, "He once said, 'Ringo isn't the best drummer in the world. He isn't even the best drummer in the Beatles'". This quote was credited to John Lennon until Mark Lewisohn discovered, in 1983, that it was Carrott who said it.

Business interests
Carrott was part-owner of the production company Celador, makers of Who Wants To Be A Millionaire? In 2006, he and wife Hazel sold their shares for £10m when Dutch interactive television company 2waytraffic bought the group of companies behind Millionaire.

Personal life
Carrott married journalist Hazel Jackson in 1972. Their daughter is the actress Lucy Davis.

He is a supporter, and was a director, of Birmingham City. He was appointed an Officer of the Order of the British Empire (OBE) in the 2003 New Year Honours "for charitable services". The University of Birmingham awarded him an honorary doctorate in 2004, following a similar award from Aston University in 1995.

Filmography

Discography

Albums
1973 – In the Club (Criminal Records)
1975 – Rabbitts On and On and On... (DJM Records) UK No. 10
1976 – Carrott in Notts (DJM Records) UK No. 56
1977 – A Pain in the Arm (DJM Records)
1978 – The Best of Jasper Carrott (DJM Records) UK No. 38
1979 – The Un-Recorded Jasper Carrott (DJM Records) UK No. 19
1980 – Made in Australia (DJM/Festival (Australia))
1981 – Beat the Carrott (DJM Records) UK No. 13
1982 – Carrott's Lib (DJM Records) UK No. 80
1983 – The Stun (Carrott Tells All) (DJM Records) UK No. 57
1985 – In America (Rhino Records)
1986 – Cosmic Carrott (Portrait Records) UK No. 66
1991 – Condensed Classics (Chrysalis/Dover Records)
1991 – 24 Carrott Gold (EMI Records)
1994 – Canned Carrott for the Record (EMI Records)
2000 – Back to the Front volume 1 (Sound Entertainment)
2000 – Back to the Front volume 2 (Sound Entertainment
2004 – 24 Carrott Gold – The Best of Jasper Carrott (Sound Entertainment)

Singles
1975 – "Funky Moped" / "Magic Roundabout" (DJM Records) UK No. 5
1976 – "Bickenhill Rovers Skin'ead Supporters Song" (DJM Records)
1977 – "12 Days of Christmas" (DJM Records)

References

External links

BBC Comedy Guide

1945 births
Living people
British stand-up comedians
Comedians from Birmingham, West Midlands
British comedy musicians
English comedy musicians
British novelty song performers
English game show hosts
English stand-up comedians
English television personalities
English television presenters
Male actors from Birmingham, West Midlands
Officers of the Order of the British Empire
People educated at Moseley School
20th-century English comedians
21st-century English comedians